Magdalena Heydel (born 1969, known also as Magda Heydel) is a Polish philologist and translator. She graduated from Jagiellonian University in Cracow, with the degree of doctor of philology in 2001 and doktor habilitowany in 2013. She is now a lecturer at this same university. Among her scholarly interests are Translation Stuides, comparative literature and literary criticism. She is editor-in-chief of Przekładaniec. A Journal of Translation Studies. She is active in the field of literary translation, translating both poetry and prose. She translated many works by Joseph Conrad, Virginia Woolf, Seamus Heaney, T.S. Eliot and Ted Hughes.

Together with Piotr Bukowski, she edited two Translation Studies anthologies in Polish: Contemporary Transaltion Theories (2009). and Polish Concepts in Transaltion (2013)

Bibliography 
 Magda Heydel, Zwrot kulturowy w badaniach nad  przekładem.
 Magda Heydel, Jan Rybicki, The Stylometry of Collaborative Translation.

External links 
 Magdalena Heydel's works at Biblioteka Jagiellońska in Cracow.

References 

Polish translators
1963 births
Living people